The governor of Sarangani, is the chief executive of the provincial government of Sarangani.

Provincial Governors (1992-2025)

References

Governors of Sarangani
Sarangani